The Cabinet Gabriel was the state government of the German state of Lower Saxony from 15 December 1999 until 4 March 2003. The Cabinet was headed by Minister President Sigmar Gabriel and was formed by the Social Democratic Party. On 15 December 1999 Gabriel was elected and sworn in as Minister President by the Landtag of Lower Saxony. A cabinet reshuffle took place in December 2000

Composition 

|}

References

Notes

Gabriel
1999 establishments in Germany
2000 in Germany
2001 in Germany
2002 in Germany
2003 disestablishments in Germany